FRH can refer to:

 Familial renal hypouricemia
 Flameless ration heater
 Frankfurt Rödelheim station, in Germany
 French Lick Municipal Airport, in Indiana, United States
 Future for Religious Heritage, a Belgian heritage organization
 National Technological University – Haedo Regional Faculty, in Argentina
 Romanian Handball Federation